Jasika may refer to:

People
Jasika Nicole (born 1980), American actress and illustrator
Omar Jasika (born 1997), Australian tennis player

Places
Jasika (Kruševac), a village in the municipality of Kruševac, Serbia
Jasika (Zenica), a village in the City of Zenica, Bosnia and Herzegovina